Canale Italia S.r.l. is a Veneto-based Italian broadcasting company.

History 
After more than 20 years broadcasting in the Northeast Italy under the name Serenissima Tv, in 2004 it acquired UHF channels from France 2 relay Telecentrotoscana that allowed the station to be seen in the whole northern Italy. After acquiring other channels to cover Rome, Serenissima TV became Canale Italia.

Canale Italia then proceeded to an aggressive campaign of expansion in the following years, being broadcast in syndication in some regions and acquiring new channels in others. On November 4, 2009, Canale Italia acquired all the channels of Perugia based station RTE 24H that covered Umbria and Tuscany alongside portions of Lazio and Marche.

Properties 
Canale Italia owns a large number of television networks altogether.

National networks within the Canale Italia group are:

Canale Italia 83 - It is the generalist flagship network with a programming consisting of information, cinema, sport and talk shows. It also broadcasts teleshopping, lottology and cartomancy programs.
Canale Italia 84 - Generalist network that includes information, musical entertainment and talk shows. It also broadcasts teleshopping, lottology and cartomancy programs.
Italia 121 - Broadcasts teleshopping.
Arte Italia 124 - Network dedicated to art.
Arte Italia 125 - Network dedicated to art.
Italia 126 - Broadcasts teleshopping.
Italia 127 - Broadcasts teleshopping.
Italia 135 - Broadcasts teleshopping.
Italia 136 - Broadcasts teleshopping.
Italia 141 - Broadcasts teleshopping.
Italia 142 - Broadcasts teleshopping.
Italia 150 - Broadcasts teleshopping.
Italia 154 - Broadcasts teleshopping.
Italia 155 - Broadcasts teleshopping.
Italia 159 - Broadcasts the local channel Video Piacenza.
Italia 160 - Broadcasts teleshopping.
Canale Italia 164 - Broadcasts teleshopping.
Canale Italia 161 - Broadcasts teleshopping.
Canale Italia 5 - Broadcasts teleshopping.
Canale Italia 6 - Broadcasts teleshopping.
Canale Italia 11 - Broadcasts teleshopping.
Canale Italia 2 - Broadcasts teleshopping.
Canale Italia 4 - Broadcasts teleshopping.
Serenissima Televisione - historically the first TV network born in the North East in 1979, of generalist nature. now, however, it broadcasts teleshopping.

The group also owns Radio Canale Italia, a web radio.

References

External links 
 Official Canale Italia website—

Television networks in Italy
Free-to-air
Italian-language television networks
Companies based in Veneto
Mass media in Venice
Veneto
Television channels and stations established in 2004
2004 establishments in Italy